Pierre-Hugues Herbert and Nicolas Mahut were the defending champions, but lost in the second round to Kevin Anderson and Novak Djokovic.

Henri Kontinen and John Peers won the title, defeating Raven Klaasen and Michael Venus in the final, 6–2, 6–7(7–9), [10–6].

Seeds
All seeds received a bye into the second round.

Draw

Finals

Top half

Bottom half

References

Sources
Main Draw

Men's Doubles